The Billy Rose Show, aka Billy Rose's Playbill, is a 30-minute American dramatic anthology series produced by Jed Harris. A total of twenty-five episodes aired on the American Broadcasting Company (ABC) from October 3, 1950 to March 27, 1951. Billy Rose served as host.

Guest stars included Leo G. Carroll, Alfred Drake, Burgess Meredith, Otto Preminger, Tom Ewell, Lionel Stander, and Cloris Leachman. Among its directors was Daniel Petrie, later a prominent feature director.  Writers included Paul Osborn, Edward Chodorov, and Ben Hecht.

The program was sponsored by Hudson Motor Car Company.

References

External links

The Billy Rose Show at CVTA

1950s American anthology television series
1950 American television series debuts
1951 American television series endings
American Broadcasting Company original programming
Black-and-white American television shows